Gordon syndrome, or distal arthrogryposis type 3, is a rare genetic disorder characterized by cleft palate and congenital contractures of the hands and feet.

Signs and symptoms 
Other signs and symptoms include short stature, bifid uvula, hip dislocation, scoliosis or kyphosis, or syndactyly. Intelligence is not affected.

Cause
Gordon syndrome is a rare autosomal dominant disorder caused by mutation in PIEZO2.

Epidemiology 
It affects males and females equally. Fewer than 50 cases have been reported worldwide.

References

 Gordon syndrome. Orphanet. February 2005; http://www.orpha.net/consor/cgi-bin/OC_Exp.php?lng=EN&Expert=376. Accessed 12/4/2012.

External links 

Genetic diseases and disorders
Rare genetic syndromes
Syndromes with musculoskeletal abnormalities
Syndromes with cleft lip and/or palate